Metro Call-A-Ride is the paratransit service provided for people who are elderly and/or disabled in the city of St. Louis, St. Louis County, Missouri, and St. Clair County, Illinois. The service has been operating since 1987.

Description
This service consists of a fleet of 120 paratransit vans that do not travel on planned routes like MetroBus and MetroLink. It provides over 55,000 trips each month to customers with disabilities in Missouri. Call-A-Ride provides service within 1/4 mile from a bus stop. The paratransit service was introduced in 1985. They are kept in the Metro Main Shop.

External links

Metro Website
Moving Transit Forward Website

 
Metro Transit (St. Louis)
St. Clair County Transit District
Public transportation in St. Louis
Public transportation in St. Louis County, Missouri
Public transportation in Greater St. Louis
Paratransit services in the United States